Tītī tōrea is a Polynesian dance. It originates from the Māori people of New Zealand and it is often performed in Polynesia, as well as in the Polynesian Cultural Center in Honolulu, O'ahu, Hawai'i, United States. It is a game involving sticks and a beat of three usually. Some tītī tōrea are used to practice hand eye coordination and to improve male warriors.

Song popular songs performed to tītī tōrea include "E Papa Waiari" and "Hurihuri".

References

Dances of Polynesia
Māori culture